Gilles Boyer (born 4 July 1971) is a French politician of the Horizons party who was elected as a Member of the European Parliament in 2019.

Early life and education
Born to two university professors, Boyer spent his childhood in Sèvres and in Ville-d'Avray in the Hauts-de-Seine region. He obtained a master's degree in law from Paris Nanterre University and a postgraduate degree in public law in 1993 from Paris 1 Panthéon-Sorbonne University.

Early career
From 2002 to 2004, Boyer served as chief of staff to Mayor of Bordeaux Alain Juppé at Bordeaux City Hall. After Juppé lost his office as mayor, he worked for media company Groupe M6 from 2004 until 2006. In 2006, he co-wrote a political novel with Édouard Philippe.

Boyer later worked as political advisor to Juppé during his time as Minister of Defense (2010–2011) and the Minister for Foreign Affairs (2011–2012).

Boyer ran Alain Juppé’s campaign in the primaries of The Republicans (LR) in 2016. Following the 2017 presidential election, he served as adviser to Philippe in his capacity as Prime Minister.

Political career
In the 2017 legislative elections, Boyer unsuccessfully ran as an LR candidate in Hauts-de-Seine's 8th constituency, losing against Jacques Maire.

From 2019 until 2022, Boyer was a quaestor of the European Parliament for two and a half years. His role as quaestor made him part of the Parliament's leadership under President David Sassoli. 

Boyer has been a member of the Committee on Economic and Monetary Affairs (since 2019) and the Subcommittee on Tax Matters (since 2020). He also serves on the five-member Advisory Committee on the Conduct of Members, the parliament’s body responsible for assessing alleged breaches of its code of conduct and advising the President of the European Parliament on possible action to be taken,

In addition to his committee assignments, Boyer is part of the MEPs Against Cancer group.

Other activities
 École nationale d'administration (ÉNA), Member of the Board of Directors (since 2019)

Controversy
In 2019, Boyer had to publicly apologize for using what he called “an ill-chosen word” after saying mayors who refused to fall into line would be considered Emmanuel Macron’s “enemies” at the time of the 2022 presidential election.

Personal life
Boyer has two daughters.

References

1971 births
Living people
MEPs for France 2019–2024
Politicians from Paris
Paris Nanterre University alumni
Pantheon-Sorbonne University alumni
Horizons politicians